Krishna Nanan Maharaj (born 26 January 1939) is a British Trinidadian businessman. In 1987 he was convicted by a Florida court for the double murders of Chinese Jamaican businessmen Derrick Moo Young and Duane Moo Young, and was sentenced to death. Maharaj has always denied committing the murders, and according to the human rights organisation Reprieve, the case of Krishna Maharaj is "an epic miscarriage of justice".

On 13 September 2019, Federal Magistrate Judge Alicia M. Otazo-Reyes made a legal finding that Maharaj had proven his innocence by "clear and convincing evidence" and that "no reasonable juror could convict him", but ruled that this was not sufficient for Maharaj to be set free.

Family 

Maharaj is of Indo-Trinidadian descent and is the brother of Ramesh Maharaj, former Attorney General of Trinidad and Tobago. He is also the brother of Indra Rambachan (née Maharaj), who is the wife of National Award-winner lawyer Roopnarine Rambachan.

Charge and detention 

According to the prosecution, in December 1986 Maharaj arranged a false meeting with Derrick Moo Young in the DuPont Plaza Hotel, in order to demand of Moo Young to repay money that he had fraudulently taken from Maharaj's relatives in Trinidad. Derrick Moo Young turned up at room 1215 together with his son Duane. Once inside the room, Maharaj is said to have appeared with a gun from behind a door. An argument resulted, and the father, Derrick Moo Young, was allegedly shot to death by Maharaj. The prosecution stated that the son, Duane, was then taken upstairs in the suite and shot by Maharaj.

In 1997, a Florida court overturned the death sentence. In 2001, almost 300 British politicians, church leaders and judges wrote a letter to the then Governor of Florida, Jeb Bush, asking for a retrial. The letter stated that there were "astonishing flaws" in the case against Maharaj. Among those signing the letter were Lord Goldsmith, then Attorney General for England and Wales and Northern Ireland, Lynda Clark, then Advocate General for Scotland, Charles Kennedy, then Leader of the Liberal Democrats, Ken Livingstone, then Mayor of London, and Nicholas Lyell, former Attorney General for England and Wales and Northern Ireland.

The governor denied him a retrial; Maharaj was instead re-sentenced to life imprisonment in 2002.

In 2006, the British human rights organisation Reprieve made an appeal to Governor Jeb Bush for clemency on Maharaj's behalf, pointing out that the jury had heard from none of Maharaj's alibi witnesses, who would have put him 25 miles away at the time of the murder; that the prosecution's star witness had changed his story several times; and that evidence had emerged since the trial that the murder victims were involved in money laundering and had links to drug traffickers, and that there were a number of alternative suspects with strong motives, which had not been considered at the time.
The appeal was denied.

In 2008, Reprieve made a second appeal for clemency to the then Governor of Florida, Charlie Crist, but this appeal was also denied.

On 24 April 2014, Judge William Thomas, from the 11th Judicial Circuit Court of Florida, Miami, allowed Maharaj's lawyer to present witnesses during an evidentiary hearing.
  
On 14 November 2014, Henry Cuervo, a former US Drug Enforcement Administration Agent, told a court that ex-hitman Jhon Jairo Velásquez Vásquez had confessed to him that Pablo Escobar had arranged the hit on the Moo Youngs. Cuervo said that Velásquez wanted to clear his conscience and had asked Cuervo to testify on his behalf. He also submitted an affidavit from Velásquez – a cartel assassin known as "Popeye" who was recently released from prison in Colombia, where he is reviled as one of the country's most infamous killers.

On 4 April 2017 the US 11th Circuit Court of Appeals granted a hearing based on evidence pointing to the involvement of Pablo Escobar's Medellín Cartel in the killings of which Maharaj has been convicted. The court said that the additional witnesses had presented "compelling" accounts that "independently corroborate one another's" and that "[a]ll five individuals' stories reflect that the Moo Youngs were killed by the cartel."

References

External links
Lester Holloway, 3 June 2012: "25 years on, Krishna Maharaj’s extraordinary case will not be forgotten". Retrieved 9 July 2012
"Millionaire Briton's 15 years on Death Row", BBC News 28 March 2002:  Retrieved 9 July 2012.
"Miami Briton 'should be freed'", BBC Newsnight 9 August 2007. Retrieved 9 July 2012
Ben Bryant, "British Man Imprisoned for Florida Murders ‘Framed’ by Drug Lord Pablo Escobar, Ex-Hitman Claims", Vice, 14 November 2014
"Kris Maharaj", Reprieve case study

1939 births
Living people
20th-century British businesspeople
British people convicted of murder
British people imprisoned abroad
British people of Indo-Trinidadian descent
British prisoners sentenced to life imprisonment
British prisoners sentenced to death
Kidnappers
People convicted of murder by Florida
Prisoners sentenced to death by Florida
Prisoners sentenced to life imprisonment by Florida
20th-century Trinidad and Tobago businesspeople
Trinidad and Tobago emigrants to the United Kingdom
Trinidad and Tobago people convicted of murder
Trinidad and Tobago people of Indian descent
Trinidad and Tobago people imprisoned abroad
Trinidad and Tobago prisoners sentenced to death
Trinidad and Tobago prisoners sentenced to life imprisonment